Countess Sophie Vladimirovna Stroganova (née Princess Golitsyna; Russian: Графиня Софья Владимировна Строганова née Княгиня Голицына; 11 November 1775, Moscow – 3 March 1845, St Petersburg) was a Russian noblewoman.

Life
The daughter of Vladimir Borisovich Golitsyn and his wife Nathalia Petrovna, Sophie received a wide education and spoke perfect French. She married Pavel Alexandrovich Stroganov on 6 May 1793. They had five children:
Alexandre Pavlovitch Stroganov : (1794–1814)
Natalia Pavlovna Stroganova : (1796–1872), sole heir to the Stroganov estates, married her cousin count Sergei Grigoryevich Stroganov (1794–1882) in 1818.
Adelaïda Pavlovna Stroganova : (1799–1882), lady in waiting, member of the Order of St Catherine, married Prince Vassili Sergueïevitch Golitsyn (1794–1836) in 1821, inherited Marino Castle from her mother in 1845
Elizaveta Pavlovna Stroganova : (1802–1863), married Prince Ivan Dmitrievitch Saltykov (1797–1832).
Olga Pavlovna Stroganova : (1808–1837), married Count Pavel Karlovitch Fersen (1800–1884).
She translated Dante's Divine Comedy into Russian and became a lady in waiting at court as well as a close friend to the German-born empress Elizabeth Alexeievna. She rebuilt and embellished Marino Castle near Andrianovo and Saint Petersburg and had Alexandre Teplaoukhov design a park for it. After the deaths of her husband and only son, she inherited most of the Stroganov residences and estates, which she rebuilt or embellished on advice from the architect Charov, whose admission to the Saint Petersburg Academy of Fine Arts she had ensured and whose studies she financed. She also founded a school for agriculture, landscape art and forestry in Saint Petersburg (1823–1844) and set up a pension fund for her servants and workers.

She took part in the Scientific and Economic Society, known for its liberal ideals, and designed a gold medal for its competitions. A bust of her was installed in the society's main hall in 1837. She also rebuilt Marino Castle in Nizhny Novgorod Governorate and in 1824 rebuilt the whole riverfront section of the town of Nizhny Novgorod with stone buildings and a grid plan designed by her - the town had belonged to the Stroganovs since the 17th century.

On her death all her lands and the title of count passed to her eldest daughter Nathalie Pavlovna's husband Sergei Grigoryevich Stroganov (1794–1882), an art collector and patron and son of Baron Grigori Stroganov (1770–1857).

References

Sources 
http://ru.rodovid.org/wk/Запись:175763

1775 births
1845 deaths
Translators of Dante Alighieri
Translators from Italian
Translators to Russian
Burials at Lazarevskoe Cemetery (Saint Petersburg)